Cristina Rosato (born January 6, 1983) is a Canadian actress. She has also appeared in TV series such as Rookie Blue, Trauma and Turner and Hooch.

Early life 
Rosato grew up in the Italian neighborhood of Montreal and spent summers in Italy. Her family moved to Canada in the 1950's and Rosato spoke Italian for the first few years of her life until she attended school where she learnt French and English.

At age 6, Rosato decided she wanted to act after watching Indiana Jones and thinking that would be fun to live out. She started taking classes and doing plays to gain experience. Rosato studied acting at The American Academy of Dramatic Arts in Los Angeles and found the course to be grueling and almost quit until she received a pep talk from her mother.

Career 
Rosata has appeared in films such as Let the Game Begin, Hidden 3D and Bad Santa 2 and has voiced characters in video games such as Caterina Sforza in the Assassin's Creed video game series. 

Rosato played the role of Dr. Giulia Amato in the long running French medical drama series, Trauma. The role called for an Italian speaking Anglophone who also spoke French which fit her perfectly. Rosato subsequently played a similar tole in the French series Les Jeunes Loups when she played Italian journalist Gabriella Fiori-Bertoni.

In 2019, Rosato was filming 'The Vegas' in Argentina when the pandemic called off shooting for a while. The role introduced her to the world of Argentine Tango and the history of Argentina.

In 2021, Rosato joined the cast of the Disney+ action-comedy series, Turner & Hooch which was inspired but the 1986 film of the same name. Her character is an Oakland cop called Olivia.

Rosato co-wrote a children's book with her cousin during the pandemic called 'A Hero Too' in which proceeds went to the Save the Children foundation.

Filmography

Film

Television
{| class="wikitable sortable"
|-
! Year
! Title
! Role
! class="unsortable" | Notes
|-
|2004
|False Pretenses
|Eva
|TV film
|-
|2009
|Les invincibles
|Jessica
|Episodes: 3.6, 3.7
|-
|2010
|Blue Mountain State
|Whitney
|Episode: "LAX"
|-
|2010
|18 to Life
|Kate
|Episode: "Wingman"
|-
|2010
|Perfect Plan
|Rebecca / Brenna Lakefield
|TV film
|-
|2011
|Murdoch Mysteries
|Sophie / Jacqueline Chiasson
|Episode: "Monsieur Murdoch"
|-
|2011
|Flashpoint
|Esmeralda "Esmie" Vargas
|Episode: "Cost of Doing Business"
|-
|2011
|Lost Girl
|Sheri
|Episode: "Fae Gone Wild"
|-
|2012
|XIII: The Series
|Gale Westlund / Jennifer
|Episode: "Tempest"
|-
|2013
|Survival Code
|Bettina
|TV film
|-
|2013
|Exploding Sun
|Marta Hernandez
|TV film
|-
|2013
|Republic of Doyle
|Samantha Kaye
|Episode: "The Devil Inside"
|-
|2013
|Rookie Blue
|Francesca
|Episode: "Homecoming"
|-
|2013
|Finding Christmas
|Mia
|Hallmark Movie 
|-
|2013-14
|Trauma
|Giulia Amaro
|Recurring role
|-
|2014
|Les Jeunes Loups
|Gabriella Fiori-Bertoni
|TV series
|-
|2014
|Saving Hope
|Anna Danko
|Episode: "Awakenings"
|-
|2015
|Nouvelle Adresse
|Soledad
|TV series
|-
|2015
|Helix
|Leila Weisner
|Episodes: "San Jose", "Ectogenesis"
|-
|2015
|Remedy
|Monica Davis
|Episodes: "When You Awoke", "Life in Technicolour", "Secrets and Lies"
|-
|2015
|Reign
|Lady Donatella
|Episode: "Betrothed"
|-
|2015
|
|Belinda Romero
|Recurring role
|-
|2016
|Bitten
|Sonja
|Episode: "Of Sonders Weight"
|-
|2016
|iZombie
|Helvetica
|Episode: "Pour Some Sugar, Zombie"
|-
|2016
|Final Destiny
|Anushka
|TV film
|-
|2016
|Summer Villa
|Leslie
|Hallmark Movie
|-
|2017
|21 Thunder
|Ana Messina
|Recurring role
|-
|2018
|Abducted : Finding My Daughter
|Ashley Quinn
|TV film
|-
|2020
|The Good Doctor
|Ann Stewart
|Episode: "Influence"
|-
|2021
|Turner & Hooch
|Olivia
|3 episodes 

2022
|Hudson and Rex (TV Series) “Dog Days are Over”
1 episode

Video Games

References

External links

Living people
1983 births
Canadian film actresses
Canadian television actresses
Canadian voice actresses
Actresses from Montreal
Canadian people of Italian descent
21st-century Canadian actresses